A dibber or dibble or dibbler is a pointed wooden stick for making holes in the ground so that seeds, seedlings or small bulbs can be planted.  Dibbers come in a variety of designs including the straight dibber, T-handled dibber, trowel dibber, and L-shaped dibber.

History
The dibber was first recorded in Roman times and has remained mostly unchanged since. In the eighteenth and nineteenth centuries, farmers would use long-handled dibbers of metal or wood to plant crops. One person would walk with a dibber making holes, and a second person would plant seeds in each hole and fill it in. It was not until the Renaissance that dibbers became a manufactured item, some made of iron for penetrating harder soils and clay.

Straight dibber
This is the classic dibber. It is anything from a sharpened stick to a more complicated model incorporating a curved handle and pointed steel end. It may be made of wood, steel or plastic.

T-handled dibber

This dibber is much like the classic dibber, but with a T-grip that fits in the palm to make it easier to apply torque. This allows the user to exert even pressure, creating consistent hole depth.

Trowel dibber
This dibber combines the features of a dibber and a trowel. It is usually forged from aluminum or other lightweight material. One end is for dibbing, and the other end is shaped like a trowel.

In popular culture
British comedian Lee Mack donated a T-handled dibber to the British Lawnmower Museum, Southport, and spoke about it on the panel game show Would I Lie to You? (Series six, Episode three, first broadcast 27 April 2012).

In military parlance an aircraft-dropped 'dibber bomb' is an anti-runway penetration bomb which destroys runways by first penetrating below the tarmac before exploding, cratering, and displacing the surface, making repairs difficult and time consuming, during which conventional airplanes can neither land nor take off.

See also
Pottiputki (tool)

References

Sources and external links
William Bryant Logan, Smith & Hawken The Tool Book, 1997
 Antique Farm Tools
 

Gardening tools
Farming tools